London 2 South East is an English level 7 Rugby Union League. When this division began in 1987 it was known as London 3 South East, changing to its current name ahead of the 2009–10 season.  The division is made up of teams predominantly from south-east London, Kent, East Sussex and West Sussex. The twelve teams play home and away matches from September through to April.  Each year all clubs in the division also take part in the RFU Intermediate Cup - a level 7 national competition.

Promoted teams move up to London 1 South with the league champions being promoted automatically and the runners up playing the runners up from London 2 South West, while demoted teams tend to move down to London 3 South East.

Teams for 2021–22

The teams competing in 2021-22 achieved their places in the league based on performances in 2019-20, the 'previous season' column in the table below refers to that season not 2020-21.

Season 2020–21

On 30 October the RFU announced that a decision had been taken to cancel Adult Competitive Leagues (National League 1 and below) for the 2020/21 season meaning London 2 South East was not contested.

Teams for 2019–20

Teams for 2018–19

Teams for 2017–18

Teams for 2016-2017
Beckenham
Bromley (promoted from London 3 South East)
Charlton Park (relegated from London 1 South)
Crowborough
Dartfordians 
Deal & Betteshanger
Heathfield & Waldron (promoted from London 3 South East)
Horsham
Hove 
Medway (relegated from London 1 South)
Old Alleynians
Old Colfeians

Teams for 2015-2016
Ashford
Beckenham
Crowborough
Dartfordians (promoted from London 3 South East)
Deal & Betteshanger
Horsham (promoted from London 3 South East)
Hove  (relegated from London 1 South)
Old Alleynians (transferred from London 2 South West)
Old Colfeians
Sevenoaks
Thanet Wanderers
Tunbridge Wells

Teams for 2014-2015
Ashford (promoted from London 3 South East)
Aylesford Bulls
Beckenham (relegated from London 1 South)
Crowborough
Deal & Betteshanger
Haywards Heath (relegated from London 1 South) withdrew from league prior to the season, now playing in Sussex 2
Maidstone
Medway
Old Colfeians
Sevenoaks
Thanet Wanderers (promoted from London 3 South East)
Tunbridge Wells

Teams for 2013-2014
Aylesford Bulls
Charlton Park
Crowborough
Deal & Betteshanger
Heathfield & Waldron
Lewes
Maidstone (promoted from London 3 South East)
Medway
Old Colfeians (relegated from London 1 South)
Sevenoaks
Tunbridge Wells (promoted from London 3 South East)
Warlingham

Teams for 2012-2013
 Aylesford Bulls
 Brighton Football Club
 Crowborough
 Charlton Park
 Deal & Betteshanger
 Heathfield & Waldron
 Lewes
 Medway
 Old Dunstonians
 Sevenoaks
 Thanet Wanderers
 Warlingham

Teams for 2011-2012
 Aylesford Bulls
 Brighton Football Club
 Charlton Park
 Deal & Betteshanger
 East Grinstead
 Heathfield & Waldron
 Lewes
 Old Dunstonians
 Old Mid-Whitgiftian
 Sevenoaks
 Tunbridge Wells
 Warlingham

Teams for 2010-2011
 Aylesford Bulls
 Brighton Football Club
 Deal & Betteshanger
 East Grinstead
 Lewes
 Maidstone
 Old Dunstonians
 Old Elthamians
 Old Mid-Whitgiftian
 Purley John Fisher
 Sevenoaks
 Warlingham

Teams for 2009-2010
 Bromley 
 Deal & Betteshanger
 Eastbourne
 Hove
 KCS Old Boys
 Lewes
 Old Dunstonians
 Old Reigatian
 Purley John Fisher
 Sevenoaks
 Tonbridge Juddian
 Warlingham

Original teams

When league rugby began in 1987 this division (known as London 3 South East) contained the following teams:

Beccehamian
Beckenham
Canterbury
Crawley
East Grinstead
Gillingham Anchorians
Horsham
Old Colfeians
Old Dunstonians 
Tunbridge Wells
Westcombe Park

London 2 South East Honours

London 3 South East (1987–1993)

Originally known as London 3 South East, this division was a tier 7 league with promotion up to London 2 South and relegation down to either Kent 1 or Sussex 1.

London 3 South East (1993–1996)

At the end of the 1992–93 season, the top six teams from London 1 and the top six from South West 1 were combined to create National 5 South.  This meant that London 3 South East dropped from a tier 7 league to a tier 8 league for the years that National 5 South was active.  Promotion continued to London 2 South, and relegation to either Kent 1 or Sussex 1.

London 3 South East (1996–2000)

The cancellation of National 5 South at the end of the 1995–96 season meant that London 3 South East reverted to being a tier 7 league.  Promotion continued to London 2 South and relegation to either Kent 1 or Sussex 1.

London 3 South East (2000–2009)

London 3 South East continued to be a tier 7 league with promotion up to London 2 South.  However, the introduction of London 4 South East ahead of the 2000–01 season meant that clubs were now relegated into this new division instead of into Kent 1 or Sussex 1.

London 2 South East (2009–present)

Nationwide league restructuring by the RFU ahead of the 2009–10 season saw London 3 South East renamed as London 2 South East.  It remained at level 7 with promotion to London 1 South (formerly London 2 South) and relegation to London 3 South East (formerly London 4 South East).

Promotion play-offs
Since the 2000–01 season there has been a play-off between the runners-up of London 2 South East and London 2 South West for the third and final promotion place to London 1 South. The team with the superior league record has home advantage in the tie.  At the end of the 2019–20 season the London 2 South West teams have been the most successful with ten wins to the London 2 South East teams nine, and the home team has won promotion on eleven occasions compared to the away teams eight.

Number of league titles

Tunbridge Wells (4)
Maidstone (3)
Beckenham (2)
Brighton (2)
Charlton Park (2)
Dartfordians (2)
Gravesend (2)
Old Elthamians (2)
Tonbridge Juddians (2)
Canterbury (1)
East Grinstead (1)
Haywards Heath (1)
Horsham (1) 
Lewes (1)
Medway (1)
Old Brockleians (1)
Old Colfeians (1)
Sidcup (1)
Westcombe Park (1)
Worthing (1)

Notes

See also
 London & SE Division RFU
 Kent RFU
 Sussex RFU
 English rugby union system
 Rugby union in England

References

External links
 London 2 South East results at the Rugby Football Union

7
3